Asclepias californica is a species of milkweed known by the common name California milkweed. It grows throughout lower northern, central and southern California.

Description
Asclepias californica is native to California and northern Baja California. It is a flowering perennial with thick, white, woolly stems which bend or run along the ground. The plentiful, hanging flowers are rounded structures with reflexed corollas and starlike arrays of bulbous anthers.

The flowers are dark purple. It grows on dry slopes.

Uses
This plant was eaten as candy by the Kawaiisu tribes of indigenous California; the milky sap within the leaves is flavorful and chewy when cooked, but can be poisonous when raw.

Butterflies
Asclepias californica is an important monarch butterfly caterpillar host plant, and chrysalis habitat plant. The cardiac glycosides caterpillars ingest from the plant are retained in the butterfly, making it unpalatable to predators.

References

External links
 Calflora Database: Asclepias californica (California milkweed)
 Jepson Manual Treatment: Asclepias californica
 University of Michigan, Dearborn: Ethnobotany: Asclepias californica
 Asclepias californica Photo gallery

californica
Flora of California
Flora of Baja California
Flora of the Sonoran Deserts
Flora of the California desert regions
Flora of the Sierra Nevada (United States)
Natural history of the California chaparral and woodlands
Natural history of the Colorado Desert
Natural history of the Mojave Desert
Natural history of the Peninsular Ranges
Natural history of the Santa Monica Mountains
Natural history of the Transverse Ranges
Garden plants of North America
Butterfly food plants
Flora without expected TNC conservation status